Romero Hollingsworth (born 13 June 1987) is a Dutch former professional footballer who played as a defender.

He previously played for FC Den Bosch, where he made 6 appearances in the 2006–07 season.

References

External links
 Player profile at Voetbal International
 Player profile at Weltfussball.de

1987 births
Living people
Dutch footballers
FC Den Bosch players
TOP Oss players
Eerste Divisie players
Footballers from Amsterdam
SV Argon players
Association football defenders